W is the second solo studio album by English recording artist Planningtorock, released on 23 May 2011 by Rostron Records and DFA Records.

Background and recording
Although Planningtorock had been working on the album's songs since 2007, eventually writing more than 27 songs, they didn't sign with DFA Records until correspondence began with James Murphy in 2010 after he sent them a fan email that said "Really like the Planningtorock stuff – just saying".

Reception

Critical reception

W received generally positive reviews from music critics upon its release. At Metacritic, which assigns a normalised rating out of 100 to reviews from mainstream critics, the album received an average score of 73, based on 16 reviews, which indicates "generally favorable reviews". Alex Denney of NME described the album as "a masterpiece of art-pop experimentalism that gleefully expands on [Planningtorock's] debut". Heather Phares from AllMusic stated, "W isn’t as rousing as its predecessor, but it may be an even richer album; in its own way, it's just as audacious". Kitty Empire, writing for The Guardian, commented that W "often takes a bit of dedication, but it's a challenging, lavish listen, too". Summarized Consequence of Sound, "It might be tempting for some to initially dismiss Planningtorock as weird for the sake of being weird, but W exposes an artist who is experimenting with musical conventions, with bizarre and often captivating results".

Accolades
Clash placed W at number 17 on its list of the top 40 albums of 2011. NME placed the album at number 25 on its list of the 50 best albums of 2011. Sentimentalist Magazine placed it at number two on its list of the top ten albums of 2011.

Singles
"Doorway" was released as the album's lead single commercially in Europe on 21 February 2011. Planningtorock directed and edited the music video for the song by themself.

"The Breaks" became the second single for W and was named the "Single of the Week" by Clash. The single included a remix by Telepathe. The song was later offered as the Free MP3 of the Day on 30 June 2011 on Spinner.

"Living It Out" serves as the album's third single and included remixes by Jackson and Billy Lock (the alias of Felix Martin from Hot Chip). Planningtorock directed two separate music videos: one for the original song and another for the remix by Laurel Halo.

Track listing
All songs and lyrics written and composed by Planningtorock, except where noted.

Personnel
Credits for W:
   

Planningtorock – vocals, producer, instrumentalist, engineer, mixing, artwork
Christoffer Berg – mixing, additional production
Sebastian Müller – mixing
Bureau – artwork
Simon Davey – mastering
Al Doyle – additional production
Olof Dreijer – additional production

Tom Hopkins – additional production
Hjorleifur Jonsson – percussion
Sten Källman – saxophone
Pat Mahoney – drums
Felix Martin – additional production
Alex Pieroni – Additional production on 'Manifesto'

References

External links

"The Breaks" at Vimeo
"Living It Out" at Vimeo

2011 albums
DFA Records albums
Planningtorock albums